Nicky Jam: El Ganador is an American biographical television series based on the life of reggaeton singer Nicky Jam. The series is directed by Jessy Terrero, and produced by Endemol Shine Boomdog for Telemundo, and Netflix. It stars Nicky Jam as the titular character. Filming began on 15 January 2018, and the series consists of 13 episodes.

The series premiered in the United States on Telemundo on 16 September 2019, while in Spain and Latin America it premiered on Netflix on 30 November 2018.

Plot 
The series focuses on Nicky Jam, an American reggaeton artist born in Lawrence, Massachusetts to a Dominican mother and Puerto Rican father. Nicky Jam had a very difficult childhood, because he grew up in an environment stained by drugs and crime, since he lived in a dangerous city and his parents used illicit substances. When he was about 8 years old, he went to live on the Island of Puerto Rico along with his father José Rivera and his sister Stephanie after the divorce of their parents. It would be in San Juan, Puerto Rico where he would spend most of his life. At an early age he became interested in urban music. He began to sing genres such as reggaeton and rap when he was a teenager and thus he would attract the attention of several important producers and singers of Puerto Rico for the time. At approximately 19 years old, he formed a musical duo along with the renowned artist Daddy Yankee called Los Cangris. This duo was one of the best in the urban genre at that time until due to conflicts between artists, it came to an end. However, Nicky had been abusing drugs since he was young and that hurt him in his personal life and in his artistic career that would go down. However, he moves to Medellin, Colombia where he begins his rehabilitation process to get away from drugs. Already rehabilitated, Nicky decides to re-try the world of music and his career grows again until he reaches the top.

Cast

Episodes

References

External links
 

2018 American television series debuts
2018 American television series endings
2010s American music television series
2010s American drama television series
Telemundo original programming
Spanish-language Netflix original programming
Spanish-language television programming in the United States
Daddy Yankee